"I'm Gone" is a song recorded by Canadian country music artist George Fox. It was released in 1998 as the first single from his sixth studio album, Survivor. It peaked at number 6 on the RPM Country Tracks chart in June 1998.

Chart performance

Year-end charts

References

1998 songs
1998 singles
George Fox songs
Warner Music Group singles
Songs written by Marv Green